Budd Lake is an unincorporated community and census-designated place (CDP) located within Mount Olive Township, in Morris County, New Jersey, United States. As of the 2020 United States census, the CDP's population was 9,784, its highest decennial census count ever and an increase of 816 (+9.1%) from the 8,968 enumerated at the 2010 census, which in turn reflected an increase of 868 (+10.7%) from the 8,100 counted at the 2000 census. Budd Lake was named for John Budd. Prior to that, it was called Hattacawanna Lake.

Geography
According to the United States Census Bureau, the CDP had a total area of 6.424 square miles (16.640 km2), including 5.443 square miles (14.099 km2) of land and 0.981 square miles (2.541 km2) of water (1.74%).

Budd Lake
Budd Lake, which the community is named after, is the source of the South Branch Raritan River. It is 7–12 feet deep, and can have large algal blooms. The bog, created by thousands of years of decaying plant material, supports wetland plants such as black spruce and tamarack, which grow on the floating mass. The lake is recharged through groundwater seepage through a series of wetlands, and serves as the headwaters of the Raritan River's South Branch. It is closely bordered by U.S. Route 46 to the south, and Sand Shore Road to the east.

Budd Lake was named for John Budd, who acquired  of land in the area in 1714. Prior to that, it was called Hattacawanna Lake.

Demographics

Census 2010

Census 2000
As of the 2000 United States Census there were 8,100 people, 2,851 households, and 2,169 families living in the CDP. The population density was 534.6/km2 (1,383.8/mi2). There were 2,994 housing units at an average density of 197.6/km2 (511.5/mi2). The racial makeup of the CDP was 87.11% White, 3.54% African American, 0.07% Native American, 5.80% Asian, 1.47% from other races, and 2.00% from two or more races. Hispanic or Latino of any race were 6.62% of the population.

There were 2,851 households, out of which 43.7% had children under the age of 18 living with them, 62.7% were married couples living together, 9.4% had a female householder with no husband present, and 23.9% were non-families. 18.4% of all households were made up of individuals, and 3.9% had someone living alone who was 65 years of age or older. The average household size was 2.83 and the average family size was 3.25.

In the CDP the population was spread out, with 28.7% under the age of 18, 6.9% from 18 to 24, 37.5% from 25 to 44, 21.2% from 45 to 64, and 5.8% who were 65 years of age or older. The median age was 34 years. For every 100 females, there were 99.0 males. For every 100 females age 18 and over, there were 96.5 males.

The median income for a household in the CDP was $62,540, and the median income for a family was $70,585. Males had a median income of $44,631 versus $35,316 for females. The per capita income for the CDP was $24,581. About 1.9% of families and 3.3% of the population were below the poverty line, including 2.4% of those under age 18 and 3.9% of those age 65 or over.

Transportation
NJ Transit offers local bus service on the MCM5 route.

Notable people

People who were born in, residents of, or otherwise closely associated with Budd Lake include:
 PES (born 1973 as Adam Pesapane), Oscar and Emmy-nominated director and stop-motion animator, whose short film Fresh Guacamole was nominated for the Academy Award for Best Animated Short Film in 2013.
 Ryan Peterson (born 1995), professional footballer who plays for the Charlotte Independence in USL League One.
 Jen Ponton (born 1984), actress, screenwriter and producer, best known for portraying Rubi in the AMC series Dietland.

See also
Pax Amicus Theatre

References

External links

 Local News

Census-designated places in Morris County, New Jersey
Mount Olive Township, New Jersey